Pheidole harrisonfordi is a species of ant in the subfamily Myrmicinae. P. harrisonfordi lives in the Americas, mostly in neotropical countries such as Belize, Colombia, southern Mexico, Panama, Guatemala and other Central American nations. P. harrisonfordi was named after the actor Harrison Ford in honor of his work in tropical conservation. The head of minor workers are flattened with the mesonotal suture absent.

See also 
 Calponia harrisonfordi
 List of organisms named after famous people (born 1900–1949)

References 

harrisonfordi
Hymenoptera of North America
Hymenoptera of South America
Insects described in 2002
Taxa named by E. O. Wilson